Krishna Talkies  is a 2021 Indian Kannada-language mystery thriller film written and directed by Vijay Anand, and produced by Govindaraju, with a music score by Sridhar V Sambram,and cinematography by Abhishek Kasargod it was released in India on 16 April 2021.

Plot 
In a single screen theater named Krishna Talkies where  mystery on cine-goers with a balcony ticket bearing the number 13 poses as a series of threats with murders, death and accidents.  Ajay, a journalist goes about unraveling the truth

Cast 

 Ajay Rao as Ajay
 Apoorva
 Sindhu Lokanath as Parimala
 Chikkanna as Suri
 Mandya Ramesh
 Shobaraj
 Pramod Shetty
 Yash Shetty
 Niranth A as Manoj
 Prakash Thuminad
 Lasya Nagaraj in special appearance

Soundtrack

Reception 
Reviewing Krishna Talkies for The Times of India, Sunayana Suresh gave three stars from five. Talkies makes for a decent watch, albeit there are some glaring glitches that need to be overlooked.
For the New Indian Express, A.Sharadhaa gave three stars from five with praise for the Ajay Rao for his performance, writing about the director she states "Krishna Talkies is an interesting suspense thriller with an ample dose of horror. Director Vijay Anand, who has taken the responsibilities of the story, screenplay writing, dialogues and lyrics, shoulders the pressure to deliver an interesting film well."

References

External links 
 

2021 films
Films set in Karnataka
2020s Kannada-language films
Films shot in Karnataka
Films postponed due to the COVID-19 pandemic